The Mitchell Mohawks were a Canadian junior 'C' ice hockey team based in Mitchell, Manitoba until 2019. A senior team with the same name also competed in the Carillon Senior Hockey League until 2013. The minor hockey organization (U7-U18) changed its name from Mitchell Mohawks to Mitchell Mustangs in 2020.
The junior team, established in 1988, competed in the Hanover Tache Junior Hockey League. The team has won two league championships. After going on hiatus for two seasons (2012–14) the team returned to league play for the 2014–15 season and has again been on hiatus since the end of the 2018-2019 season.

HTJHL Championships 
1992–93
2003–04

(2006-07, 2007-08 Finalists)

Season-by-season

Note: GP = Games played, W = Wins, L = Losses, OTL = Overtime Losses, SOL = Shootout Losses, Pts = Points

Senior Mohawks 

The Senior Mohawks were co-founders of the CSHL in 2003. The team became the first champion to represent the league at the Allan Cup by winning the first two CSHL championships. After five seasons, the club went on hiatus for three seasons from 2008 to 2011, but returned for the 2011-12 and 2012-13 seasons. The team again went on hiatus in 2013. The Senior Mohawks were previously members of the Hanover-Tache Hockey League.

CSHL Championships

2003-04
2004-05

Season-by-season

Note: GP = Games played, W = Wins, L = Losses, OTL = Overtime Losses, SOL = Shootout Losses, Pts = Points

See also
List of ice hockey teams in Manitoba

References

External links
 
 Hanover Tache Junior Hockey League
 Carillon Senior Hockey League

Ice hockey teams in Manitoba

Sport in Eastman Region, Manitoba